This was the first edition of the tournament.

Julia Grabher won the title, defeating Nuria Brancaccio 6–4, 6–2 in the final.

Seeds

Draw

Finals

Top half

Bottom half

Qualifying

Seeds

Qualifiers

Lucky losers

Draw

First qualifier

Second qualifier

Third qualifier

Fourth qualifier

References

Main draw
Qualifying draw

External links
 WTA website of the tournament

2022 WTA 125 tournaments